The Anajapygidae are a small family of diplurans. They can be distinguished by their relatively short, stout cerci, which discharge abdominal secretions. Unlike most diplurans, which are largely predatory, these are scavengers.

Species
The family Anajapygidae contains two genera, with eight recognized species:

 Genus Anajapyx Silvestri, 1903
 Anajapyx amabilis Smith, 1960
 Anajapyx carli Pagés, 1997
 Anajapyx guineensis Silvestri, 1938
 Anajapyx menkei Smith, 1960
 Anajapyx mexicanus Silvestri, 1909
 Anajapyx stangei Smith, 1960
 Anajapyx vesiculosus Silvestri, 1903
 Genus Paranajapyx Pagés, 1997
 Paranajapyx hermosus (L.Smith, 1960)

References

Diplura
Arthropod families